Lou Reed Live is a live album by Lou Reed, released in 1975. It was recorded at the same concert as Rock 'n' Roll Animal ; on December 21, 1973, at Howard Stein's Academy of Music in New York.
It features three songs from Transformer, one song from The Velvet Underground & Nico (Reed's former band's debut album) and two songs from Berlin. Between this album and the remastered Rock 'n' Roll Animal, the entire show has been released, albeit in a different order than the original concert setlist.

In 2003, RCA/BMG re-issued this album under their "Extended Versions" series. The title was changed to reflect this, but the contents remained unchanged.

This live album's stereo mix differs from its counterpart in that guitarist Dick Wagner is heard on the left channel, and Steve Hunter is on the right; this arrangement is reversed on Rock 'n' Roll Animal.  After the last song ("Sad Song") fades to crowd noise, someone can be heard shouting "Lou Reed sucks!".

Track listing
All tracks composed by Lou Reed

Side one
"Vicious" – 5:55
"Satellite of Love" – 6:03
"Walk on the Wild Side" – 4:51

Side two
"I'm Waiting for the Man" – 3:38
"Oh, Jim" – 10:40
"Sad Song" – 7:32

Personnel
Musicians
 Lou Reed – vocals
 Steve Hunter – guitars
 Dick Wagner – guitar, vocal
 Prakash John – bass, vocals
 Pentti "Whitey" Glan – drums, percussion
 Ray Colcord - keyboards
 Rob Hegel — background vocals ("Sad Song" only)

Production and artwork
 Gus Mossler - engineer
 Bruce Somerfeld, George Semkiw - production assistance
 Oliviero Toscani - cover photography

Charts

References

Albums produced by Lou Reed
Lou Reed live albums
1975 live albums
RCA Records live albums
Albums recorded at the Palladium (New York City)